Roger Valley (born January 29, 1957 in Kenora, Ontario) is a Canadian politician. He was a member of the House of Commons of Canada from 2004 to 2008, representing the riding of Kenora for the Liberal Party.

Valley worked as a commercial fisherman before entering federal politics. He also served as a city councillor and mayor of Dryden, and was the president of the local provincial Liberal Party riding association for almost ten years.

He was elected to parliament in the 2004 federal election, defeating NDP candidate Susan Barclay and Conservative Bill Brown in a close three-way race.  The seat was left open after former Liberal cabinet minister Robert Nault announced his retirement from politics.

Valley initially won the Liberal nomination in a close contest against Charles Fox, a local aboriginal leader.  Unlike the situation in some other Ontario ridings, the nomination battle did not result in lingering divisions for the local party organization; Fox endorsed Valley during the general election.

In the 2006 federal election Valley was re-elected in another close race against Brown and Barclay.  He lost to Greg Rickford of the Conservative Party in 2008.

Election results

References

External links

1957 births
Liberal Party of Canada MPs
Living people
Mayors of places in Ontario
Members of the House of Commons of Canada from Ontario
People from Dryden, Ontario
People from Kenora
21st-century Canadian politicians